Anzor Nadim Rashad Nafash (born 2 November 1978) is a professional football coach and former player who played as a midfielder.

Born in the Russian SFSR to a Russian father and a Jordanian mother, Nafash became a Jordanian citizen through naturalization. Between 2002 and 2003, he played four matches for the Jordan national team.

Early life
Nafash was born in the Russian SFSR, Soviet Union to a Russian father and a Jordanian mother. He obtained Jordanian citizenship in order to represent the Jordan national team.

Managerial career 
On 16 January 2020, Nafash was appointed head coach of Al-Ahli.

References

External links
 

1978 births
Sportspeople from Nalchik
Living people
Russian people of Jordanian descent
Jordanian people of Russian descent
Russian footballers
Jordanian footballers
Naturalized citizens of Jordan
Association football midfielders
PFC Spartak Nalchik players
Al-Ahli SC (Amman) players
FK Sutjeska Nikšić players
FC SKA Rostov-on-Don players
FC Lukhovitsy players
FC Avangard Kursk players
Jordanian Pro League players
Jordan international footballers
Russian expatriate footballers
Jordanian expatriate footballers
Expatriate footballers in Serbia and Montenegro
Russian expatriate sportspeople in Serbia and Montenegro
Jordanian expatriate sportspeople in Serbia and Montenegro
Association football coaches
Russian football managers
Jordanian football managers
Al-Ahli SC (Amman) managers
Jordanian Pro League managers